Babel (stylized in all caps) is a Japanese manga series written and illustrated by Narumi Shigematsu. Babel was first published as a tankōbon volume by Shogakukan in April 2012 and was later serialized in the publisher's seinen manga magazine Monthly Ikki from May 2012 to September 2014, when the magazine ceased its publication, and the series continued and finished with its fifth volume.

Publication
Written and illustrated by Narumi Shigematsu, Babel was first released as a tankōbon volume by Shogakukan on April 27, 2012. Due to its popularity, Babel started its serialization in Shogakukan seinen manga magazine Monthly Ikki on May 25, 2012. The magazine ceased its publication on September 25, 2014, and the series would be finished with its fifth volume, released on August 28, 2015.

Volume list

References

External links
 

Science fiction anime and manga
Seinen manga
Shogakukan manga